Carl von Hess (7 March 1863, in Mainz – 28 June 1923, in Possenhofen) was a German ophthalmologist known for his work in ocular physiology.

He studied medicine at the universities of Heidelberg, Bonn and Strasbourg, then traveled to Prague, where he worked with ophthalmologist Hubert Sattler and physiologist Ewald Hering. In 1891 he obtained his habilitation from the University of Leipzig, and later on, he held professorships at the universities of Marburg (from 1896), Würzburg (from 1900) and Munich (from 1912).

He made significant contributions in his studies of refraction and accommodation of the eye. He also conducted research on color vision in the various retinal zones, on the various forms of color blindness, of simultaneous contrast, on afterimages of moving objects and of light-dark adaptation. In addition, he performed comparative physiological studies on light sense and color vision involving animals, in invertebrates as well as vertebrates. Along with Paul Römer, he made the discovery that trachoma is transmissible to monkeys.

His name is associated with the "Hess afterimage", defined as a positive afterimage that occurs third in the series of afterimages that are the result of exposure to a brief light stimulus (sequentially, the first afterimage is referred to as a "Hering afterimage", the second as a "Purkinje afterimage"). The Hess afterimage is defined as a physiological illusion. There are also several surgical instruments that are named after him.

Published works 
 Die Refraktion und Akkommodation des menschlichen Auges und ihre Anomalien, 1902 – Refraction and accommodation of the human eye and its anomalies. 
 Pathologie und Therapie des Linsensystems, 1905 – Pathology and therapy of the lens system.
 Vergleichende Physiologie des Gesichtssinnes, 1912 – Comparative physiology of vision.
 Die Entwicklung von Lichtsinn und Farbensinn in der Tierreihe, 1914 – Development of light sense and color vision in the animal kingdom.
He was also an editor of later editions of Saemisch and Graefe's "Handbuch der gesamten Augenheilkunde".

References 

1863 births
1923 deaths
Physicians from Mainz
German ophthalmologists
Academic staff of the University of Marburg
Academic staff of the Ludwig Maximilian University of Munich
Academic staff of the University of Würzburg